K. Lakshminarayanan is an Indian politician from All India NR Congress. He was elected from the Raj Bhavan in the Puducherry Legislative Assembly election in 2016 as a member of Indian National Congress.

He was suspended from the Congress party for his anti-party activities. Following that Namassivayam submitted his MLA resignation letter to the assembly speaker and quit the Congress party the day before Puducherry's trust vote in 2021.

References

All India NR Congress politicians
Puducherry politicians
Living people
Year of birth missing (living people)
Puducherry MLAs 2016–2021
Puducherry MLAs 2011–2016
Puducherry MLAs 2021–2026
Indian National Congress politicians